Starr House may refer to:

Starr Manor, Glenwood Springs, Colorado, listed on the National Register of Historic Places (NRHP) in Garfield County, Colorado
C. J. Starr Barn and Carriage House, Stamford, Connecticut, NRHP-listed
Starr House (Wilmington, Delaware), NRHP-listed
Starr-Truscott House, Birmingham, Ohio, listed on the NRHP in Erie County, Ohio
Horace C. Starr House and Carriage Barns, Elyria, Ohio, listed on the NRHP in Lorain County, Ohio
Edwin and Anna Starr House, Monroe, Oregon, listed on the National Register of Historic Places in Benton County, Oregon
Starr House (Marshall, Texas), listed on the National Register of Historic Places in Harrison County, Texas
Starr Ranch, Hanksville, Utah, listed on the NRHP in Garfield County, Utah